The Honeywell T87 Round Thermostat is a thermostat that Honeywell International, Inc. first manufactured in 1953. Henry Dreyfuss designed the thermostat based on a concept by Honeywell engineer Carl Kronmiller.

References

External links 
 "Honeywell Round Thermostat" in MNopedia, the Minnesota Encyclopedia

Products introduced in 1953
Honeywell
Temperature control